Badr Brigade may refer to:

Badr Organization, in Iraq
Badr Brigade in the Jordanian Army
Badr Brigade, a Syrian rebel group affiliated with Jaysh al-Islam